Carmen Cartellieri (born Franziska Ottilia Cartellieri, 28 June 1891 – 17 October 1953), also known as Carmen Teschen, was an Austrian actress and producer.

Early life 
Carmen Cartellieri was born on 28 June 1891, as Franziska Ottilia Cartellieri. She was born in Proßnitz, Austria-Hungary (now Prostějov, Czech Republic), but spent most of her childhood in Innsbruck, Austria. Her father was an engineer. When she was 16, she married Emanuel Ziffer Edler von Teschenbruck, known as Mano Ziffer-Teschenbruk. Teschenbruck was an aristocrat who was originally an artist who later became a director. They had one child together, Ruth (born 1910).

Career 
Cartellieri's early career was developed with help from her husband, Teschenbruck, and Cornelius Hintner, a Tyrolean director in Hungary who used to be a cameraman for Pathé. Cartellieri featured in various Hungarian silent films throughout 1918 to 1919. Her stage name was Carmen Teschen. She acted in her first Austrian film, The Gypsy Girl (1919), directed by Hinter. Supposedly, she cowrote the film. She also starred in Hinter's film, The Strangling Hand/The Hand of the Devil, in 1920. Political situations after the war in Hungary forced her to move from Budapest to Vienna. Carmen was able to become a big star, acting in German-language films during the 1920s.

In 1920, Carmen founded the Cartellieri-Film company with Teschenbruck and Hinter. She also used her surname to suggest she was from Italy. The first production of her company was a comedy directed by Teschenbruck called Carmen Learns to Ski (1920). The Viennese public liked her a lot and chose her as 'the most beautiful actress of Vienna'. The second production of the company was The Strangling Hand/The Hand of the Devil (1920), directed by Hinter. This film was critically praised for the effectiveness of its narrative and Carmen's performance.

Carmen continued to act in the company's films including The White Death (1921), The Tragedy in the Dolomites (1921), Creature from the Starworld (1922), The Yellow Danger (1922), and The Sin of Inge Lars (1922).

Creature from the Starworld (1922) was directed by Teschenbruk with Carmen, and was the first full-feature length silent film dealing with outer space not adapted from writings by Jules Verne. Carmen also produced Hinter's Die Sportlady (1922), which gave her the "vamp" image. Carmen often preferred to work with Tilde Fogl and Rita Barré, female screen writers, during her acting and producing career.

Carmen won many beauty and fashion prizes from 1921 to 1923 and became more famous than other female film stars such as Liane Haid and Magda Sonja. She starred in Wilhelm Thiele’s Fiat Lux (1923), Robert Wiene’s The Hands of Orlac (1924), and Hans Homma’s Die Puppe des Maharadscha/The Doll of the Maharajah (1924).

Her decline as a lead actress began after Robert Wiene's Austrian silent epic, The Cavalier of the Rose (1926). Once the silent era ended, Carmen was not able to move her career into sound. Her last appearance was in The Fate of the Habsburgs (1928).

Theater 
Cartellieri also worked in the theater during the 1920s. She often appeared at the Ronacher theater in Vienna, but she was also seen in the 1926 Pantomime Der Todesring (The Ring of Death).

Partial filmography

 A sors ökle (1918) - Hella
 Kettös álarc alatt (1918) - Wilson detektíva detektív nõvére
 A cigányleány (1919) - A cigányleány
 Az összeesküvök (1919) - Santini énekesnõ
 A bosszú (1919) - Mirjam, Uziel lánya
 Teherán gyöngye (1919)
 Marion Delorme (1919)
 Az elrabolt szerencse (1920) - Éva / Mária
 Büßer der Leidenschaft (1920)
 Die Würghand (1920) - Rose
 Die Liebe vom Zigeuner stammt... (1920)
 Der weiße Tod (1921) - Carmen Riccardi
 The Dead Wedding Guest (1922) - Donna Clara
 Die Sünde der Inge Lars (1922)
 Die Frauen des Harry Bricourt (1922)
 Parema - Das Wesen aus der Sternenwelt (1922)
 Die Menschen nennen es Liebe... (1922)
 Die gelbe Gefahr (1922)
 Die Sportlady (1922)
 Töte sie! (1922)
 Fiat Lux (1923) - Tochter des Ingenieurs
 Eines Vaters Söhne (1923)
 Das Geheimnis der Schrift (1924)
 Die Tragödie einer Frau (1924)
 The Hands of Orlac (1924) - Regine
 Die Puppe des Maharadscha (1924)
 Was ist Liebe...? (1924)
 Boarding House Groonen (1925)
 Frauen aus der Wiener Vorstadt (1925)
 Der Rosenkavalier (1925) - Annina
 Der Balletterzherzog. Ein Wiener Spiel von Tanz und Liebe (1926) - Madame Spalanzoni - the Prima Ballerina
 The Family without Morals (1927) - Sophie
 Infantrist Wamperls dreijähriges Pech (1927)
 Todessturz im Zirkus Cesarelli (1927)
 Madame Dares an Escapade (1927)
 Die Strecke (1927) - Anna - die Kassierin in der 'Traube'
 Die Ehe einer Nacht (1927) - Dina Elkström
 The Man with the Limp (1928) - Madame Pique
 Ein Wiener Musikantenmädel (1928)
 The Gambling Den of Montmartre (1928) - Die Zimmervermieterin
 The Fate of the House of Habsburg (1928) - Countess Larisch
 Der Mitternachtswalzer (1929) - (final film role)

Bibliography
 Jung, Uli & Schatzberg, Walter. Beyond Caligari: The Films of Robert Wiene. Berghahn Books, 1999.

References

External links

 Carmen Cartellieri at Women Film Pioneers Project

1891 births
1953 deaths
Actors from Prostějov
People from the Margraviate of Moravia
Austrian film actresses
Austrian stage actresses
Austrian silent film actresses
20th-century Austrian actresses
Women film pioneers